The New York City Subway is a rapid transit system that serves four of the five boroughs of New York City in the U.S. state of New York: the Bronx, Brooklyn, Manhattan, and Queens. Operated by the New York City Transit Authority under the Metropolitan Transportation Authority of New York, the New York City Subway is the busiest rapid transit system in the United States and the seventh busiest in the world, with 5.225 million daily riders. The system's  stations qualifies it to have the largest number of rapid transit stations in the world.

Three rapid transit companies merged in 1940 to create the present New York City Subway system: the Interborough Rapid Transit Company (IRT), the Brooklyn–Manhattan Transit Corporation (BMT), and the Independent Subway System (IND). All three former systems are present in Brooklyn.

History 

The vast majority of current subway lines in Brooklyn trace their lineage back to the Brooklyn–Manhattan Transit (BMT) and Brooklyn Rapid Transit (BRT), as well as earlier predecessors. The oldest right-of-way in the entire subway system is that of the West End Line. Its right-of-way began passenger service on October 9, 1863, as a surface steam railroad called the Brooklyn, Bath and Coney Island. It was later rebuilt under the Dual Contracts, opening as the current elevated road on June 24, 1916. The West End line is not the oldest elevated in Brooklyn. That honor goes to the BMT Jamaica Line with the section from Gates Avenue to Van Siclen Avenue to an opening on May 13, 1885. The oldest un-rebuilt section still in use, is from Alabama Avenue to Cypress Hills. That section opened between September 5, 1885, and May 30, 1893. Both segments were originally part of the demolished BMT Lexington Avenue Line. The rest of the line from Marcy Avenue to Broadway Junction was rebuilt during the Dual Contracts. It was also extended past Cypress Hills towards Jamaica, Queens during that time.

Similar histories to the BMT West End Line can be found with the BMT Sea Beach Line (New York and Sea Beach Railroad), and BMT Culver Line (Prospect Park and Coney Island Railroad). Other truncated lines dating back to the same period as the Jamaica and Lexington Els are the Myrtle Avenue and BMT Fulton Street Lines.

Both the BMT Franklin Avenue Line and BMT Brighton Line began as another excursion railroad to Coney Island called the Brooklyn, Flatbush and Coney Island Railway. Originating on July 2, 1878, the BF&CI ran from the former Bedford Station on the Atlantic Branch of the Long Island Rail Road, to Brighton Beach. It also had a spur to the Sheepshead Bay Race Track southeast of Neck Road. Losing their connection to the LIRR in 1893, the railroad almost collapsed until it was acquired by the Kings County Elevated Railway in 1896, which electrified the line by 1899 for both rapid transit and streetcar lines, and itself became part of Brooklyn Rapid Transit in 1900. Grade elimination projects took place during the mid-1900s and late-1910s. A subway connection between Prospect Park and DeKalb Avenue on the BMT Fourth Avenue Line was completed by 1920.

The BMT Canarsie Line began on October 21, 1865, as the Brooklyn and Rockaway Beach Railroad, a surface steam excursion railroad line for beachgoers. Once acquired by the BRT in 1906, it was split between a mostly elevated rapid transit line from Rockaway Boulevard and Broadway Junction, and the Canarsie Shuttle streetcar line south of Rockaway Boulevard to Jamaica Bay by 1920. A subway extension to Manhattan from Broadway Junction known as the "14th Street–Eastern District Line" was built in 1928. The Liberty Avenue extension of the Fulton Street Elevated opened on September 25, 1915, and the extension of the Jamaica Avenue Elevated to Walnut Street opened on May 28, 1917. A further extension of the latter line opened to Cliffside Avenue on July 2, 1918.

Also on June 22, 1915, the BRT opened the Fourth Avenue Subway from Myrtle Avenue to 59th Street as well as the BMT Sea Beach Line, which provided service to Coney Island. The Fourth Avenue Line was then extended the line south to 86th Street in Bay Ridge on January 15, 1916. The West End Line opened in stages. The line opened from Ninth Avenue to 18th Avenue on June 24, 1916, to 25th Avenue on July 29, 1916, and to Coney Island on July 21, 1917. Culver Line service was inaugurated on March 16, 1919, to Kings Highway. Service was extended to Avenue X on May 10, 1919, before running through to Coney Island on May 1, 1920. The Montague Street Tunnel opened on August 1, 1920, connecting Brooklyn directly to Lower Manhattan. On the same date, the connection between the Brighton Line connection between Prospect Park and DeKalb Avenue was opened. Two additional stations along the Fourth Avenue Line were opened at a later date by the BMT. An in-fill station, Lawrence Street, was opened in Downtown Brooklyn on June 11, 1924, and the line was extended to its new terminal at 95th Street in Fort Hamilton on October 31, 1925. The Fourth Avenue Line would replace the elevated BMT Fifth Avenue Line on June 1, 1940, and inherited the connections to the West End and Sea Beach Lines. The Myrtle Avenue station was closed in 1956 as part of the reconstruction of the DeKalb Avenue junction.

Besides the BMT and its predecessors, the Interborough Rapid Transit Company expanded two subways and one elevated line into Brooklyn. The Eastern Parkway Line was built under Brooklyn Borough Hall to Atlantic Avenue in 1908 and then to Utica Avenue in Crown Heights in 1920. This line is fed from Manhattan by the IRT Lexington Avenue Line via the Joralemon Street Tunnel as well as the Brooklyn Branch of the IRT Broadway–Seventh Avenue Line through the Clark Street Tunnel. Additionally, two extensions from the Eastern Parkway Line was built in 1920. The first being the Nostrand Avenue Line from the Brooklyn Botanic Garden to Flatbush Avenue in Flatbush. The second was the elevated New Lots Line, over East 98th Street and Livonia Avenue in Brownsville and East New York to Pennsylvania Avenue, and was expanded to New Lots Avenue in 1922.

In 1933, the city-owned Independent Subway System built the IND Crosstown Line from Court Square in Long Island City south to Nassau Avenue in Greenpoint, and then from Metropolitan Avenue in Williamsburg to Hoyt and Schermerhorn Streets in Downtown Brooklyn. Additionally, in 1933, they built IND Brooklyn Line from Jay Street–Borough Hall to Church Avenue station. Three years later, the IND Sixth Avenue Line was connected to Jay Street through the Rutgers Street Tunnel. The connecting ramps between Church Avenue and Ditmas Avenue on the BMT Culver Line did not exist until 1954, and once they did, the Culver Line was "recaptured" by the IND, with them except for the Culver Shuttle northwest to Ninth Avenue on the BMT West End Line. This segment of the BMT Culver Line was abandoned on May 10, 1975. The newest line in Brooklyn is the ramp from the IND Fulton Street Subway connecting with the former BMT Fulton Street elevated which opened on April 29, 1956. This ramp includes a connection to Pitkin Yard and the Grant Avenue station.

Description 

There are 170 New York City Subway stations in Brooklyn (171 if 75th Street–Elderts Lane, which is located in both Brooklyn and Queens, is included). When transfer stations with two or more non-adjacent platforms are counted as one station, the number of stations is 157. The physical trackage lines within Brooklyn include:

 BMT Elevated (& streetcars)
 Original right-of-way:
 BMT Franklin Avenue Line
 BMT Jamaica Line
 BMT Canarsie Line
 BMT Brighton Line
 IRT Eastern Parkway Line
 BMT Jamaica Line
 BMT Myrtle Avenue Line
 BMT Fourth Avenue Line
 BMT Sea Beach Line
 BMT West End Line
 BMT/IND Culver Line
 IRT Broadway-Seventh Avenue Line
 IRT Nostrand Avenue Line
 IRT New Lots Line
 IND Eighth Avenue Line
 IND Brooklyn (Culver) Line
 IND Crosstown Line
 IND Fulton Street Line
 IND Sixth Avenue Line

Lines and services 

There are 170 New York City Subway stations in Brooklyn, per the official count of the Metropolitan Transportation Authority; of these, 22 are express-local stations. If the 10 station complexes are counted as one station each, the number of stations is 157. In the table below, lines with colors next to them indicate trunk lines, which determine the colors that are used for services' route bullets and diamonds. The opening date refers to the opening of the first section of track for the line. In the "division" column, the current division is followed by the original division in parentheses.

Stations 

Permanently closed subway stations, including those that have been demolished, are not included in the list below. The 95th Street station is listed under "Bay Ridge–95th Street."

See also

Notes

References

Further reading

 
New York City Brooklyn
Sub
Brooklyn-related lists